"G.I. Blues" is a song first recorded by Elvis Presley as part of the soundtrack for his 1960 motion picture G.I. Blues. Its first LP release was on the eponymous soundtrack album in October 1960.

In some countries it was also released on a single or an eponymous EP.

Writing and recording history 
The song was written by Sid Tepper and Roy C. Bennett.

Presley recorded it during the soundtrack recordings for the Paramount movie G.I' Blues at the RCA Studio in Hollywood on April 27–28, 1960. Takes 7 and 10 were spliced together to form the vocal master.

Track listings 
7-inch single (Victor SS 1251, Japan, 1960)
 "G.I. Blues" (2:35)
 "Doin' The Best I Can" (3:10)

7-inch single (Italy, Israel)
 "Wooden Heart"
 "G.I. Blues"

7-inch EP (France, Israel)
 "Tonight's All Right For Love"
 "Wooden Heart"
 "G.I. Blues"
 "Didja' Ever"

Charts

References

External links 
 Elvis Presley – Wooden Heart / G.I. Blues (7-inch single, Italy, South Africa, 1961) at Discogs
 Elvis Presley - G.I. Blues (EP) at Discogs

Songs about soldiers
Film theme songs
1960 songs
1961 singles
Elvis Presley songs
RCA Records singles
Songs written by Sid Tepper
Songs written by Roy C. Bennett
Songs written for films